Nemacheilus arenicolus is a species of ray-finned fish in the genus Nemacheilus which is found only in the  Nam Theun and Nam Gnouang rivers in Laos .

Footnotes 

 

A
Fish described in 1998